Alfred Pendarves 'Pen' Reynolds (4 May 1892 – 24 November 1979) was an Australian rules footballer who played for Collingwood in the VFL during the 1910s.

Pen Reynolds, who attended Wesley College, was mainly a follower but could also play as a defender and in attack. He appeared in a total of four VFL Grand Finals, winning the 1917 and 1919 premiership deciders. The 1919 Grand Final win was his last game in the league.

References

Holmesby, Russell and Main, Jim (2007). The Encyclopedia of AFL Footballers. 7th ed. Melbourne: Bas Publishing.

1892 births
1979 deaths
Australian rules footballers from Melbourne
Collingwood Football Club players
Collingwood Football Club Premiership players
Two-time VFL/AFL Premiership players
People from Fairfield, Victoria
People educated at Wesley College (Victoria)